"Crazy" is a song by American hard rock band Aerosmith and written by Steven Tyler, Joe Perry, and Desmond Child. It was the final single from their massively successful 1993 album Get a Grip, released in May 1994. "Crazy" peaked at number 17 on the US Billboard Hot 100, number three in Canada, and number one in Iceland for two weeks. In Finland and the United Kingdom, it was released as a double-A side with "Blind Man", reaching number eight in the former country and number 23 in the latter.

Composition
The song is set in A major and follows the  time signature.  It was written earlier, around the same time as "Angel," but the band felt it had to "spread out their ballads to retain their rock image."

Music video

The video for the song was directed by Marty Callner and received heavy rotation on MTV. It was one of the most requested videos of 1994. It featured the third appearance of Alicia Silverstone in the band's videos, and was the career debut of Steven's then 16-year-old daughter, Liv Tyler. The decision to cast Liv in the video for "Crazy" was based on the video's creators having seen her in a Pantene commercial. "I understand why people might have a problem with [the video's content]," she remarked. "But I have no problem with it, and Steven has no problem with it. And if other people have a problem with it, it's their problem."

The film-like video depicts Silverstone and Tyler as schoolgirls who skip class and run away, driving off in a 1993 black Ford Mustang GT convertible in a manner similar to the 1991 film Thelma & Louise. The two use their good looks to take advantage of a service station clerk and, needing money, enter an amateur pole-dancing competition. The video is edited to show the similarities in stage moves of Steven Tyler and daughter Liv. The girls win the dance competition, then spend the night in a motel. They continue their joyride the following day, where they encounter a young, sweaty and shirtless farmer (played by model Dean Kelly) aboard a tractor tilling land in the countryside. They persuade him to join them in their journey, where they all go skinny dipping in a lake. The girls take off with his clothes and leave him behind at the lake. Naked, he chases after them, and rejoins them in the convertible. The final seconds of the video show the word "Crazy" spelled out in cursive in the cropland by the still-running tractor as the farmer runs towards it and the girls drive off.

Jason London makes a short cameo at the end in a tag scene, reprising his character from the "Amazing" video.

Director's cut
A longer director's cut of the video appears on the compilation Big Ones You Can Look At. This version features a few more provocative clips, and a longer, more risque version of the pole-dancing competition scene. It also removes the scene in which the girls abandon the farmer after skinny-dipping with him. Both versions of the video include an extra reprise of the chorus which is not included on the album and radio versions.

Accolades
The song earned the band a Grammy Award for Best Rock Performance by a Duo or Group with Vocal in 1994. This was the band's second Grammy win for Get a Grip and third overall. The video for "Crazy" was ranked number 23 on VH1's "Top 100 Music Videos of All Time".

Track listing

Charts

Weekly charts

Year-end charts

Certifications

Release history

Legacy
The song appeared on several compilations including Big Ones, A Little South of Sanity, O, Yeah! Ultimate Aerosmith Hits and Devil's Got a New Disguise. Despite bringing much success for the band in the mid-1990s, Aerosmith rarely performed it on tour until it was added to international shows on their 2007 World Tour due to overwhelming demand from fans. It was covered in Glee by Jacob Artist and Melissa Benoist, mashed up with Britney Spears' "(You Drive Me) Crazy".

References

Aerosmith songs
1990s ballads
1993 songs
1994 singles
Blues rock songs
Geffen Records singles
Glam metal ballads
Glam metal songs
Music videos directed by Marty Callner
Number-one singles in Iceland
Song recordings produced by Bruce Fairbairn
Songs written by Desmond Child
Songs written by Joe Perry (musician)
Songs written by Steven Tyler